The Ann Charlotte and Jacob Hinkel House is a house listed on the National Register of Historic Places in Saint Paul, Minnesota, United States.  It was built by ice-dealer Jacob Hinkel in 1873 two miles north of downtown, in a rural area in what was New Canada township; the rural route was named after Horace J. Brainerd (1825-1902) an influential property-owner and politician.

References

Houses completed in 1873
Houses in Saint Paul, Minnesota
Houses on the National Register of Historic Places in Minnesota
National Register of Historic Places in Saint Paul, Minnesota
Italianate architecture in Minnesota